Pat Ross is the name of:

Pat Ross (businessman) (born 1960), CEO of Steeplejack Industrial
Pat Ross (American football) (born 1983), American football player

See also
Patrick Ross, football coach